Antonio Schembri may refer to:

 Nino Schembri (born 1974), Brazilian mixed martial artist
 Antonio Schembri (ornithologist) (1813–1872), Italian ornithologist